Shooting competitions at the 2015 European Games in Baku were held from 13 to 19 June 2015 at the Baku Shooting centre.

Nineteen events were in the program with 330 athletes participating. The programme featured several non-Olympic Mixed team events. The winners of the fifteen Olympic events automatically qualified to the 2016 Summer Olympics.

Qualification

The bulk (295 from 330) of qualification quota places were awarded based on European rankings as of 31 December 2014. The quota places were for athletes who were among:
- 33 top-ranked in Men's Trap and Skeet;
- 30 top-ranked in all individual Pistol and Rifle events of either gender;
- 18 top-ranked in Women's Trap and Skeet, and Men's Double Trap.

The maximum number of athletes per country was 2 in each event. Should there be among the top ranked athletes more than 2 then the exceeding places are added to the pool of Universality places, in order to increase the number of nations represented. Host country athletes were not restricted to the ranking qualification standard. Azerbaijan was guaranteed 9 host quota places, 5 for men and 4 for women.

Mixed events were not subject to the quota qualification standard. Nations with entries in both the relevant men's and women's events would be able to compete with existing shooters.

Medal summary

Men's events

Women's events

Mixed events

Medal table

Participating nations 
A total of 330 athletes from 48 nations competed in Shooting at the 2015 European Games:

References

External links
Results Book

 
2015
Sports at the 2015 European Games
2015 in shooting sports
Shooting competitions in Azerbaijan